Kieran Molloy is an Irish professional boxer. As an amateur he won a bronze medal at the 2018 EU Championships.

Professional career 
On 16 December 2021, Molloy signed a contract with promotional companies Top Rank and Conlan Boxing.

He made his professional debut on 26 February 2022 at the OVO Hydro in Glasgow, fighting on the undercard of Josh Taylor vs Jack Catterall against Damian Esquisabel. Molloy won via technical knockout in the second round.

He was scheduled to fight Johnathan Ryan Burrs on the undercard of Artur Beterbiev vs Joe Smith Jr. on 18 June 2022, However, the fight was cancelled last minute due to Burrs testing positive for COVID-19.

His next fight was scheduled on the undercard of Michael Conlan vs Miguel Marriaga on 6 August 2022 against a journeyman, Evgenii Vazem, who he defeated in the second round by a body shot. After the victory, Molloy stated during an interview that he would love to headline in his hometown, Galway, for his next fight and expects that to happen sooner rather than later due to being in talks since his professional debut.

Molloy had his first fight outside of the United Kingdom fighting on the undercard of Padraig McCrory vs Leon Bunn facing against, Sandro Jajanidze, who he defeated him by unanimous decision in Frankfurt, Germany.

His fourth professional bout was against journeyman, Alexander Zeledon, who he defeated via corner retirement on 10 December 2022.

It was announced by Conlan Boxing that Kieran Molloy will be bringing back professional boxing to Galway for the first time since 2009, headlining in his hometown, for his fifth professional bout for the 21 April 2023 against an unannounced opponent.

Professional boxing record

References

Living people
Year of birth missing (living people)
Irish male boxers
Southpaw boxers
Sportspeople from Galway (city)
Light-middleweight boxers
European Games competitors for Ireland
Boxers at the 2019 European Games
21st-century Irish people